Godden is a surname. Notable people with the surname include:

Brad Godden (born 1969), Australian rugby player
Edwin J. Godden (1888–1979), English-born businessman and political figure in Newfoundland
Ernie Godden (born 1961), Canadian ice hockey player
Gertrude M. Godden, author of works on anthropology and folklore
Jean Godden, member of the Seattle City Council
Jimmy Godden (1879–1955), British actor
Jon Godden (1906–1984), English novelist
Luke Godden (born 1978), Australian footballer
Malcolm Reginald Godden (born 1945), Rawlinson and Bosworth Professor of Anglo-Saxon
Matt Godden (born 1991), English footballer
Rumer Godden (1907–1998), English author
Salena Godden, a British poet, performer and writer
Thomas Godden, real surname Tylden (1624–1688), English courtier implicated in the Titus Oates plot
Tony Godden (born 1955), English football goalkeeper
Tony Godden (Australian rules footballer) (born 1972), Australian footballer

See also
Godden Green, a hamlet in Kent, England
The Loves of Joanna Godden, a 1947 British historical drama film